Virgin is the debut and only Korean studio album by South Korean girl group After School. They promoted the album by performing their lead single         "Shampoo" along with a tap dance performance of "Let's Step Up". It was released on 29 April 2011 and contains 13 songs (including new recordings of their songs "Because of You", "When I Fall", and "Bang!"). The group has released three music videos for the album: "Shampoo", "Let's Step Up", and "Play Ur Love". This is the first release with the addition of the member E-Young and first release with nine-member line-up and last release to feature member Bekah.

History 

Following the admission of ninth member, E-Young, Pledis Entertainment announced that After School will be having a comeback at the end of April 2011. They also announced that After School will release their first full-length studio album. Before the release of the album, several actions were made by the agency such as releasing a mini-album for the group leader Kahi and also the release of Orange Caramel's "Bangkok City".

On 18 April 2011, Pledis released a photo teaser of the album, featuring fourth generation member E-young. The track-listing and three other member photos followed, which were separated into third, second, and first generation members. On the day before the album's release, Pledis uploaded the video of their lead track "Shampoo" and "Let's Step Up!" on their official channel at YouTube.

Their comeback stage was held on KBS Music Bank and they performed "Shampoo" and "Let's Step Up".

The album contains nine new tracks, three re-recorded songs, and a radio edit. Two of the new tracks, "Lean on Time" and "My Bell" are solo songs sung by main vocal members Raina and Jungah.

Two songs from the album feature a Pre-School Girl: in "Dream" features Yoonjo, which in 2012 debuted on the group Hello Venus, and in "Funky Man", a duet song of the members Nana and Lizzy, features Kyung Min.

Track listing

Charts 
Virgin was released in the Philippines on 23 July 2011, along with Bang! and Happy Pledis 1st Album, and it debuted at number one on the Philippines AstroChart, while Bang! debuted at number two and Happy Pledis 1st Album at number three.

Album chart

Other songs charted

Release history

References

External links 
  

2011 debut albums
After School (band) albums
Korean-language albums
Kakao M albums
Hybe Corporation albums